Markus Pöyhönen (born 25 October 1978, in Vantaa) is a Finnish former track and field athlete, who specialised in the 100m sprint. Pöyhönen's trainer during his active career was Atte Pettinen.

At the 2002 European Championships in Athletics he became the first Finnish male in history to reach the 100 m sprint final in an international championship event. He finished fifth in the race, though years later Dwain Chambers was disqualified and Pöyhönen's final position was fourth.

He finished seventh in the 60 metres final at the 2003 IAAF World Indoor Championships in Birmingham.

His 100 m personal best, also set in 2002, is 10.23 seconds; 0.02 s shy of the Finnish national record.

Progression 
(100 m)

External links 
 

1978 births
Living people
Finnish male sprinters
Sportspeople from Vantaa